Christopher John Hunt (born 1 December 1968) is a retired badminton player from England.

Personal life 

Chris Hunt was born on 1 December 1968 in Bolton, England. He has one brother. 
In 2000 he met Liza Giambattista. In 2007 Hunt had a daughter called Gabriella Giambattista-Hunt. Then in 2018 Hunt and Giambattista got married after 18 years of being together.

Career 
Hunt won the gold medal at the European Championships in the men's doubles with Simon Archer in 1994 and 1998. In 1996 they won the bronze medal.
Hunt also won two commonwealth gold medals in the mixed team event and mixed doubles in Victoria [1994] Along with a silver medal in the men's doubles.

He also participated at the 1992 Olympic Games in men's doubles, with Andy Goode, and they were defeated in the round of 16 by Lee Sang-bok and Shon Jin-hwan. At the 1996 Olympic Games, he competed in the men's doubles with Simon Archer, losing in quarterfinals, and in mixed doubles with Joanne Muggeridge, losing in round of 32. Hunt also competed at the 2000 Olympic Games in the mixed doubles with Donna Kellogg, and they were beaten in the round of 32.

Major Achievements

IBF World Grand Prix 
The World Badminton Grand Prix sanctioned by International Badminton Federation (IBF) from 1983 to 2006.

Men's doubles

References 

1968 births
Living people
Sportspeople from Bolton
English male badminton players
Badminton players at the 1992 Summer Olympics
Badminton players at the 1996 Summer Olympics
Badminton players at the 2000 Summer Olympics
Olympic badminton players of Great Britain
Badminton players at the 1994 Commonwealth Games
Badminton players at the 1998 Commonwealth Games
Commonwealth Games gold medallists for England
Commonwealth Games silver medallists for England
Commonwealth Games bronze medallists for England
Commonwealth Games medallists in badminton
Medallists at the 1994 Commonwealth Games